Yeni Kafkasya (Turkish: New Caucasus) was a biweekly political and literary magazine which was published in Istanbul between 1923 and 1927. The magazine is known for its founder Mehmet Emin Resulzade, an Azerbaijani national who was in exile in the newly founded Republic of Turkey.

History and profile
Yeni Kafkasya was founded by Mahammad Emin Resulzade in Istanbul in 1923, and its first issue appeared on 26 September 1923. It came out biweekly. The magazine had an anti-communist political stance. Resulzade edited the magazine which received contributions from the exiled Azerbaijanis and also, from the leading nationalist figures, including Zeki Velidi Togan, Yusuf Akçura and Ahmed Cevad. 

Between 15 December 1925 and 6 February 1926 the magazine stopped publication. The magazine was closed down in late 1927 upon the request of the Ministry of Interior due to its alleged harmful publications. The magazine was succeeded by another magazine, Azeri Türk, which was launched by the same individuals. 

Resulzade's articles featured in Yeni Kafkasya were published in 2017 as a book entitled Yeni Kafkasya Yazıları (1923–1927).

References

1923 establishments in Turkey
1927 disestablishments in Turkey
Biweekly magazines published in Turkey
Defunct political magazines published in Turkey
Magazines established in 1923
Magazines disestablished in 1927
Magazines published in Istanbul
Turkish-language magazines
Literary magazines published in Turkey
Pan-Turkism